Torbay and Southern Devon Health and Care NHS Trust was a NHS trust that provided health and care in and around Torbay, Devon, England. It was a pioneer within the NHS in England in demonstrating the advantages of integrating health and social care into one organisation. And "one of three areas that have been working to learn from Kaiser Permanente, a leading United States health maintenance organisation."  It was established as Torbay Care Trust in October 2005, with responsibility for social care in a partnership agreement with Torbay Borough Council. From then until April 2012, the trust had responsibility for both commissioning (buying) and providing integrated health and social care services to people in the Torbay area. As part of the changes associated with the Health and Social Care Act 2012 the commissioning function was detached from the trust.

It ran Ashburton and Buckfastleigh Hospital, Brixham Hospital, Paignton Hospital, Tavistock Hospital, Dartmouth Hospital, Bovey Tracey Hospital, Kingsbridge Hospital, Newton Abbot Hospital, Totnes Hospital, Teignmouth Hospital and Dawlish Hospital.

The trust named Mears Group in December 2014 as the preferred bidder to run its Living Well@Home Services contract to integrate IT systems and deliver a range of community-based services for a minimum of five years.

Occombe House in Paignton is owned by Torbay Council and was run by the trust. It provides for eight residents who require a high level of care and round-the-clock support. It was agreed in January 2015, after a dispute lasting seven years, that the existing building should be replaced by two new four bedroom bungalows, which will be built and run by Sandwell Community Caring Trust.

It was named by the Health Service Journal as one of the top hundred NHS trusts to work for in 2015.  At that time it had 1689 full-time equivalent staff and a sickness absence rate of 4.41%. 73% of staff recommend it as a place for treatment and 65% recommended it as a place to work.

The trust was taken over by South Devon Healthcare NHS Foundation Trust forming a new organisation Torbay and South Devon NHS Foundation Trust in October 2015.

See also
 List of NHS trusts

References

Health in Devon
Defunct NHS trusts